The Arch Bridge from the Boonton Ironworks crosses the Rockaway River in Grace Lord Park in the town of Boonton in Morris County, New Jersey. The single-span fieldstone arch bridge was built by John Carson Sr. in 1866 to carry a water pipe to the ironworks. It was added to the National Register of Historic Places on September 1, 2022, for its significance in engineering. It is currently used as a pedestrian bridge.

History and description
In 1866, Fuller & Lord, operators of the ironworks, hired local mason John Carson Sr. to construct a fieldstone arch bridge to carry a water pipe across the Rockaway River in the Boonton Gorge. The pipe would provide a reliable source of water for fire protection at the ironworks. Water from the Morris Canal was not always available.

In 2020, the New Jersey Historic Trust funded the stabilization and restoration of the bridge, located in the New Jersey Register of Historic Places state-designated Boonton Ironworks Historic District.

See also
 National Register of Historic Places listings in Morris County, New Jersey
 List of bridges on the National Register of Historic Places in New Jersey

References

External links
 

Boonton, New Jersey
Bridges completed in 1866
Stone arch bridges in the United States
Bridges in Morris County, New Jersey
National Register of Historic Places in Morris County, New Jersey
Industrial buildings and structures on the National Register of Historic Places in New Jersey
Bridges on the National Register of Historic Places in New Jersey
Pedestrian bridges on the National Register of Historic Places
New Jersey Register of Historic Places